The 1921 Montana State Bobcats football team was an American football team that represented Montana State College (later renamed Montana State University) in the Rocky Mountain Conference (RMC) during the 1921 college football season. In their second season under head coach D. V. Graves, the Bobcats compiled a 2–4 record (0–1 against RMC opponents), finished in last place out of nine games in the RMC, and were outscored by a total of 74 to 63.

Schedule

References

Montana State
Montana State Bobcats football seasons
Montana State Bobcats football